The following are the squads of national teams that played in the 1919 South American Championship. The participating countries were Argentina, Brazil, Chile and Uruguay. The teams played in a single round-robin tournament, earning two points for a win, one point for a draw, and zero points for a loss.

Argentina
Head Coach: Federal Technical Committee

Brazil
Head coach:  Haroldo Domingues

.

Chile
Head Coach:  Héctor Parra

Uruguay
Head Coach:  Severino Castillo

References 

Squads

Copa América squads